The Pompano Colored School, also known as the Pompano Beach Colored School, was located at 718 NW Sixth Street, Pompano Beach, Florida. Pompano's first school for colored students, a two-room wooden building on the 400 block of Hammondville Road (today Martin Luther King, Jr. Blvd), was destroyed in the 1926 Miami hurricane. It was replaced in 1928 by a two-story, six-classroom building, with library, assembly hall, and separate office for the principal. The Rosenwald Fund provided matching funds to those raised by the African-American community; Broward County also contributed. Principal was Blanche Ely, who spearheaded efforts for its construction. It was originally for grades one through six, and later expanded to the 11th grade. In 1954, it was renamed Coleman Elementary School, in honor of Reverend James Emanuel Coleman, pastor of Pompano's Mount Calvary Baptist Church.

The school closed in 1970, with school desegregation. It was demolished in 1972 and the site is now Coleman Park. There is a historical marker.

References

Rosenwald schools
Pompano Beach, Florida
Buildings and structures in Pompano Beach, Florida
Broward County Public Schools
High schools in Broward County, Florida
Historically segregated African-American schools in Florida
Defunct public high schools in Florida
Public elementary schools in Florida
Defunct public schools in Broward County, Florida
Educational institutions established in 1928
Educational institutions disestablished in 1970
1928 establishments in Florida
1970 disestablishments in Florida
Defunct black public schools in the United States that closed when schools were integrated